Jonathan Vega Gastelum (born 6 September 1997) is a Mexican professional footballer who plays as a forward.

References

External links
 
 
 

1997 births
Living people
Mexican footballers
Liga MX players
Cimarrones de Sonora players
Sportspeople from Mexicali
Footballers from Baja California
Association football forwards